David Clark (born 6 April 1971) is a former professional rugby league footballer and coach who played as a  in the 1990s and 2000s. He played at representative level for Wales, and at club level for Gold Coast Chargers and Barrow Raiders.

Playing career
Born in Cardiff, Clark moved to Australia at a young age. He signed for Barrow Raiders in 1999 from Gold Coast Chargers, and went on to make 136 appearances for the club.

International honours
Clark won caps for Wales while at Barrow Raiders in 2004.

References

1971 births
Living people
Barrow Raiders coaches
Barrow Raiders players
Gold Coast Chargers players
Rugby league hookers
Rugby league players from Cardiff
Wales national rugby league team players
Welsh rugby league players
Workington Town coaches